Gahanna-Jefferson Public Schools is a school district headquartered in Gahanna, Ohio, in the Columbus, Ohio metropolitan area.

In addition to almost all of Gahanna, the district serves a portion of Columbus. Its territory is in Jefferson and Mifflin townships.

History
Circa 2007 the district began holding Chinese classes, with 40 students enrolled in them altogether. By 2011 this number was up to 350, and the district was attempting to secure grants from the U.S. federal government and the central government of China, with each being $1,000,000 and $30,000, respectively. By January 2011 the Hanban agreed to give a $30,000 grant. The U.S. Department of Education had granted $762,000, to be used in a five-year period, as part of the Foreign Language Assistance Program (FLAP). By November 2012 it had ended all FLAP funding, and hence the district lost what remained of its grant.

On August 1, 2016, Steve Barrett became the superintendent of the district.

Politics 
The Gahanna-Jefferson Public School District is run by the Gahanna-Jefferson Public School board, headed by President Beryl Piccolantonio as of September 8, 2021.

In October 2020, Gahanna-Jefferson Education Association, the teacher's union in the school district, voted to go on strike in wake of a contract dispute with the school board. The strike, which gained support of teachers, students, and community members, lasted from 13 October 2020 through 16 October 2020.

Schools
High school
 Lincoln High School

Middle schools
 Middle School East
 Middle School South
 Middle School West

 Elementary schools
 Blacklick Elementary School
 Chapelfield Elementary School
 Goshen Lane Elementary School
 High Point Elementary School
 Jefferson Elementary School
 Lincoln Elementary School
 Royal Manor Elementary School

 Pre-Kindergarten
 Preschool Program

Eastland-Fairfield Career & Technical School

References

External links
 Gahanna-Jefferson Public Schools

School districts in Ohio
Education in Franklin County, Ohio
Education in Columbus, Ohio